Humidicutis marginata is a gilled fungus of the waxcap family.

Taxonomy
The species was first described as Hygrophorus marginatus by Charles Horton Peck in 1876. William Alphonso Murrill called it Hygrocybe marginata in 1916. It was transferred to the new genus Humidicutis by Rolf Singer in 1958, who had previously placed it in Tricholoma.

Edibility
It is considered edible with a pleasant taste, but one guide says it is "not worthwhile".

References

Edible fungi
Hygrophoraceae